This is the electoral history of Pat Buchanan. Buchanan served as an advisor to three United States presidents: Richard Nixon, Gerald Ford, and Ronald Reagan. He then became a conservative columnist and co-hosted Crossfire, a political program on CNN.

In 1992, never before having sought elected office, Buchanan challenged incumbent president George H. W. Bush for the Republican Party presidential nomination. Buchanan lost each contest, but received nearly 40 percent of the vote in the New Hampshire primary and ultimately received about 23 percent of the primary vote. He again sought the GOP presidential nomination in 1996, winning three contests and garnering almost 21 percent of the vote; Kansas Senator Bob Dole ultimately won the party's nomination.

Buchanan left the Republican Party in 1999 and joined the Reform Party, founded by two-time independent presidential candidate Ross Perot. He received more than 25 percent of the popular vote in the primary, then secured the nomination at the convention, selecting conservative activist Ezola Foster for his running mate. The Buchanan—Foster ticket received the fourth—most popular votes in the 2000 United States presidential election, though failing to secure any votes in the Electoral College.

Presidential primaries (1992)

George H. W. Bush (inc.) - 9,199,463 (72.84%)
Pat Buchanan - 2,899,488 (22.96%)
Unpledged delegates - 287,383 (2.28%)
David Duke - 119,115 (0.94%)
Ross Perot - 56,136 (0.44%)
Pat Paulsen - 10,984 (0.09%)
Maurice Horton - 9,637 (0.08%)
Harold Stassen - 8,099 (0.06%)

Presidential primaries (1996)

Popular vote
Bob Dole - 9,024,742 (58.82%)
Pat Buchanan - 3,184,943 (20.76%)
Steve Forbes - 1,751,187 (11.41%)
Lamar Alexander - 495,590 (3.23%)
Alan Keyes - 471,716 (3.08%)
Richard Lugar - 127,111 (0.83%)
Unpledged delegates - 123,278 (0.80%)
Phil Gramm - 71,456 (0.47%)
Bob Dornan - 42,140 (0.28%)
Morry Taylor - 21,180 (0.14%)

Won in Alaska, Louisiana, Missouri, and New Hampshire

Delegate count
Bob Dole - 1928
Pat Buchanan - 47
Steve Forbes - 2
Alan Keyes - 1
Robert Bork - 1

Presidential primaries (2000)

Popular vote

Donald Trump - 2,878 (33.39%)
Pat Buchanan - 2,213 (25.68%)
Uncommitted - 1,164 (13.51%)
No preference - 617 (7.16%)
Charles E. Collins - 535 (6.21%)
John B. Anderson - 468 (5.43%)
Robert M. Bowman - 292 (3.39%)
John Hagelin - 220 (2.55%)
George Weber - 217 (2.52%)

Delegates
Pat Buchanan - 453 (98.69%)
Abstaining - 6 (1.31%)

2000 United States presidential election

George W. Bush/Dick Cheney (R) - 50,460,110 (47.9) and 271 electoral votes (30 states carried)
Al Gore/Joe Lieberman (D) - 51,003,926 (48.4%) and 266 electoral votes (20 states and D.C. carried)
Abstaining - 1 electoral vote (faithless elector from D.C.)
Ralph Nader/Winona LaDuke (Green) - 2,883,105 (2.7%)
Pat Buchanan/Ezola B. Foster (Reform) - 449,225 (0.4%)
Harry Browne/Art Olivier (Libertarian) - 384,516 (0.4%)
Howard Phillips/Curtis Frazier (Constitution) - 98,022 (0.1%)
John Hagelin/Nat Goldhaber (Natural Law) - 83,702 (0.1%)

References 

Buchanan, Pat
Pat Buchanan